is a passenger railway station located in the city of Kōka, Shiga Prefecture, Japan, operated by the West Japan Railway Company (JR West).

Lines

Station layout
The station consists of one side platform serving  single bi-directional track. The station is designed with a "ninja" motif in line with the city of Kōka promoting its historical connection with ninjitsu as a tourist attraction. The station is staffed.

Platforms

History
Aburahi Station opened on December 15, 1959 as a station on the Japan National Railway (JNR) . The station became part of the West Japan Railway Company on April 1, 1987 due to the privatization and dissolution of the JNR.

Passenger statistics
In fiscal 2019, the station was used by an average of 288 passengers daily (boarding passengers only).

Surrounding area
 Koka City Aburahi Elementary School
 Aburahi Shrine

See also
List of railway stations in Japan

References

External links

JR West official home page

Railway stations in Shiga Prefecture
Railway stations in Japan opened in 1959
Kōka, Shiga